Toshiko and Leon Sash at Newport is a live album recorded at the Newport Jazz Festival in 1957 and released on the Verve record label.  All 4 Toshiko Akiyoshi tracks are also included on some later re-issues of the Norgran (Verve) recording Toshiko's Piano / Amazing Toshiko Akiyoshi.

Track listing
LP side A (Toshiko Akiyoshi Trio set):
"Between Me and Myself" (Akiyoshi) 
"Blues for Toshiko" (Akiyoshi) 
"I'll Remember April" (Raye, DePaul, Johnston) 
"Lover" (Rodgers, Hart)

LP side B (Leon Sash Quartet set):
"Sash-Kebob" (Sash, Morgan)
"Meant for Brent" (Sash, Robinson)
"Carnegie Horizons" (Shearing)
"Blue Lou" (Mills, Sampson)

Personnel
Side A:
Toshiko Akiyoshi –  piano
Gene Cherico –  bass
Jake Hanna –  drums
Side B:
Leon Sash – accordion 
Ted Robinson –  tenor saxophone, clarinet
Lee Morgan –  bass 
Roger Price –  drums

References

Verve Records MGV-8326
Polydor K.K. POCJ-2074 (CD)

Toshiko Akiyoshi live albums
Albums recorded at the Newport Jazz Festival
1957 live albums
1957 in Rhode Island
Verve Records live albums
Split albums